Allan Bertram Borodin  (born 1941) is a Canadian-American computer scientist who is a professor at the University of Toronto.

Biography
Borodin did his undergraduate studies at Rutgers University, earning a bachelor's degree in mathematics in 1963. After earning a master's degree at the Stevens Institute of Technology in 1966 (while at the same time working part time as a programmer at Bell Laboratories), he continued his graduate studies at Cornell University, completing a doctorate in 1969 under the supervision of Juris Hartmanis.
He joined the Toronto faculty in 1969 and was promoted to full professor in 1977. He served as department chair from 1980 to 1985, and became University Professor in 2011.

Awards and honors
Borodin was elected as a member of the Royal Society of Canada in 1991. In 2008 he won the CRM-Fields-PIMS prize. He became a fellow of the American Association for the Advancement of Science in 2011, and a fellow of the Association for Computing Machinery in 2014 "For contributions to theoretical computer science in complexity, on-line algorithms, resource tradeoffs, and models of algorithmic paradigms." In 2020 he received the Order of Canada.

Selected publications
Research articles

Books

See also
 Gap theorem
 Online algorithms
 Computational Complexity

References

External links
 Home Page at University of Toronto

1941 births
Living people
Academic staff of the University of Toronto
American computer scientists
Rutgers University alumni
Stevens Institute of Technology alumni
Cornell University alumni
Fellows of the Royal Society of Canada
Fellows of the American Association for the Advancement of Science
Fellows of the Association for Computing Machinery
Theoretical computer scientists
Members of the Order of Canada